Kaisa Juuso (born 23 September 1960 in Alatornio) is a Finnish politician currently serving in the Parliament of Finland for the Finns Party at the Lapland constituency.

References

1960 births
Living people
People from Tornio
Finns Party politicians
Members of the Parliament of Finland (2019–23)
21st-century Finnish women politicians
Women members of the Parliament of Finland